Nachhatar Gill (born Nachhatar Singh Gill) is a Punjabi musician and singer-songwriter. He was born to a Sikh family at their village Akaalgarh near Badesron, Tehsil Garhshankar, Punjab, India. Gill was very fond of music. His father was a kirtani (hymn singer at Sikh temple). He used to sing along with his father at their village's temple's annual program. Gill got popularity with his solo song "Dil Ditta Nahin Si". His two religious albums are Sahib Jinah Diyan Mane (2006), and Ardaas Karaan (2010). He appeared in his first movie, Gal Sun Ho Gaya in 2012. He has appeared in three more films since then, the latest one being Jugaadi Dot Com in 2015.

Discography

Film songs

Religious

Religious single

Duo collaboration
 Lagda Ishq Ho Gaya 2 – Song: Maa
 Sardari – Music: DNA
 Nain Naina Naal
 Master Saleem – Main Tuta Dil Han Vol 5
 Jaspinder Narula – Desi DJ
 Bhangra Hi Fi
 Dhol Sharabi
 Motivation
 Ajj Dhamalan Paingian
 Mele Diyaan Raunkaan
 Dil Wich Pyar Tera
 Bhangra Smackdown
 Grand Theft Rickshaw
 Pendu Crew Finally Released
 Chakh De Dholia
 Jattan De Munde
 Punjabi Vibes 1
 Desi Top Duet Hits Vol 1
 Vasdi Reh
 Nasha Jawani Da
 Mumtaj Bewafa Ae
 Ik Jindri Hits Of Punjabi Masala
 Dj Virsa Jado Yaad Meri
 Various
 Ultimate Bhangra 06
 Guldasta Geetaan Da
 Dil
 Jashan
 Aao Sare Nachiye
 Zabardast Hits (14 Superhit Songs)
 Dil Wali Peedh
 Paigaam Likhe
 Assi Kita Hai Pyaar
 Bhangra Pulse Vol 2
 Kito Dil Vi
 Various
 Absolut Bhangra 3
 Breakin' The Silence
 Bhangra Hi Fi Vol 1
 Sonu Nigam Breaking The Silence
 Jaspinder Narula Dhol SoundZ Hitz Vol 2
 Aman Statis The Road To Perfection
 Da OcPz Bhangra Intoxicated CD 1
 Dj Playuhh Bhangin Nonstop
 KSR Bhangra Cult 3
 Dj Raju They See Pt 2
 Various Now That Gangsta
 Dj Gugnu Bhangra 4 You Vol 2
 Various Best Of Punjabi Duets Vol 3
 Various Planet Bhangra Vol 3
 Nachattar Gill Gal Dil Te Laggi Ae All Time Sad Hits CD 1
 Nachattar Gill Gal Dil Te Laggi Ae All Time Sad Hits CD 2
 Nachattar Gill Gal Dil Te Laggi Ae All Time Sad Hits CD 3
 Nachattar Gill Gal Dil Te Laggi Ae All Time Sad Hits CD 4
 Various Khotian Kismatan CD 3
 Various Khotian Kismatan CD 5
 Dil Tan Tutde Rehnde Ne
 Thokran
 Dil Wali Peedh Vol 9
 Collaborations 2 (Mul Nai Lagda) Music: Sukshinder Shinda
 Lagda Ishq Hogaya
 Gabroo (Youngster 2)
 0001 Desi Gun (Khadka Darhka)
 Again 101 Bhangra CD1
 Again 101 Bhangra CD2
 Darda Di Dawa
 Dil Da Dard
 Nach Patlo
 Lad Gaya Pecha
 Ik Ik Pal
 Various Tanhaaiyan CD 1
 Various Tanhaaiyan CD 2
 Various Maahi (My Love)
 Teri Aakh
 Yaara Naal Bahara in 2011 CD-1
 Survivor
 Desi Vibes
 Hit List 2010
 Progressive
 Scooter
 Dance Beat
 The Stars
 Rabba Mereya
 Nacheneh Da Shaunk
 Aappan Pher Milange
 The Missing Part Is You
 Saadi Wakhri Hai Shaan
 Burrraahh
 Living Legend

Filmography

References

Bhangra (music)
People from Birmingham, West Midlands
Living people
English people of Indian descent
Punjabi people
1968 births

ar:سوكشيندر شيندا